Poria – Kfar Avoda (lit. "Poria - Village [of] Labour") is a community settlement in northern Israel. Located to the south-east of the Sea of Galilee near Tiberias, it falls under the jurisdiction of Emek HaYarden Regional Council.

History
The village was founded in 1949 by some 90 families who had immigrated from Yemen, with the assistance of the Jewish Agency for Israel.

References

Community settlements
Populated places established in 1949
Populated places in Northern District (Israel)
1949 establishments in Israel
Yemeni-Jewish culture in Israel